The New England Hundred Highest is a list of the hundred highest summits in New England, used in the mountaineering sport of peak bagging.

The order and elevation figures are those listed on the official list; other sources may differ.

List

See also 

 Northeast 111 4000-footers
 New England Four-thousand footers
 Adirondack Forty-sixers
 New England Fifty Finest

Notes

External links 
  amc4000footer.org: The New England Hundred Highest List
  PeakBagger.com: AMC New England Hundred Highest
  New England Hundred Highest Cheatsheet Map

 
New England Hundred Highest
New England Hundred Highest